"Dokudanjou Beauty" (独壇場Beauty) (English: Incomparable Beauty) is the twenty-ninth single by the Japanese rock band Buck Tick, released on March 24, 2010. It placed 7th on Oricon's weekly chart.

Track listing

Musicians

Atsushi Sakurai - Voice
Hisashi Imai - Guitar
Hidehiko Hoshino - Guitar
Yutaka Higuchi - Bass
Toll Yagami - Drums
Kazutoshi Yokoyama - keyboard

References

2010 singles
Buck-Tick songs
2010 songs
Ariola Japan singles
Songs with music by Hisashi Imai